, formerly known as . 
He was a half-brother of Toyotomi Hideyoshi, one of the most powerful and significant warlords of Japan's Sengoku period and regarded as 'Hideyoshi's brain and right-arm'. 

He was also known by his court title, . He promoted Tōdō Takatora to chief engineer. He led Hideyoshi's vanguard force a few years later into Satsuma Province, contributing heavily to his half-brother's victories in gaining control of Kyūshū. Hidenaga was awarded the provinces of Kii, Izumi and Yamato, reaching a governance of one million koku.

He took part in the 1582 Battle of Yamazaki, the 1583 Battle of Shizugatake, also lead Toyotomi's troops at the Invasion of Shikoku (1585), and the 1587 Battle of Takajo, Battle of Sendaigawa and Siege of Kagoshima.

He died in 1591, at Kōriyama, Yamato Province (now Nara Prefecture), and his tomb is called .

Family
 Father: Chikuami
 Mother: Ōmandokoro (1516-1592)
 Siblings: 
 Toyotomi Hideyoshi
 Asahi no kata
 Tomo, married Soeda Jinbae
 Wife: Chiun'in
 Children:
 Koichiro later Yosuke
 Kikuhime, married Toyotomi Hideyasu
 Daizen-in, married Mori Hidemoto

Honours
Junior Second Rank (August 8, 1587)

References

See also
Hōkoku Shrine (Osaka)

 

1540 births
1591 deaths
Samurai
Japanese Buddhists
Toyotomi clan
Deified Japanese people